Antimony pentafluoride is the inorganic compound with the formula SbF5. This colourless, viscous liquid is a strong Lewis acid and a component of the superacid fluoroantimonic acid, formed upon mixing liquid HF with liquid SbF5 in 1:1 ratio. It is notable for its strong lewis acidity and the ability to react with almost all known compounds.

Preparation
Antimony pentafluoride is prepared by the reaction of antimony pentachloride with anhydrous hydrogen fluoride: 
SbCl5 + 5 HF → SbF5 + 5 HCl
It can also be prepared from antimony trifluoride and fluorine.

Structure and chemical reactions
In the gas phase, SbF5 adopts a trigonal bipyramidal structure of D3h point group symmetry (see picture). The material adopts a more complicated structure in the liquid and solid states. The liquid contains polymers wherein each Sb is octahedral, the structure being described with the formula [SbF4(μ-F)2]n ((μ-F) denotes the fact that fluoride centres bridge two Sb centres). The crystalline material is a tetramer, meaning that it has the formula [SbF4(μ-F)]4. The Sb-F bonds are 2.02 Å within the eight-membered Sb4F4 ring; the remaining fluoride ligands radiating from the four Sb centers are shorter at 1.82 Å. The related species PF5 and AsF5 are monomeric in the solid and liquid states, probably due to the smaller sizes of the central atom, which limits their coordination number. BiF5 is a polymer.

In the same way that SbF5 enhances the Brønsted acidity of HF, it augments the oxidizing power of F2. This effect is illustrated by the oxidation of oxygen:
2 SbF5 + F2 + 2 O2 → 2 [O2]+[SbF6]−
Antimony pentafluoride has also been used in the first discovered chemical reaction that produces fluorine gas from fluoride compounds:
4  + 2  → 4  + 2  + 

Hexafluoroantimonate
SbF5 is a strong Lewis acid, exceptionally so toward sources of F− to give the very stable anion [SbF6]−, called hexafluoroantimonate. [SbF6]− is a weakly coordinating anion akin to PF6−. Although it is only weakly basic, [SbF6]− does react with additional SbF5 to give a centrosymmetric adduct:
SbF5 + [SbF6]− → [Sb2F11]−

Safety
SbF5 reacts violently with many compounds, often releasing dangerous hydrogen fluoride. It is highly corrosive to the skin and eyes. It's a strong oxidizer.

References

External links
 WebBook page for SbF5
National Pollutant Inventory - Antimony and compounds fact sheet
National Pollutant Inventory - Fluoride compounds fact sheet

Superacids
Antimony(V) compounds
Fluorides
Metal halides